Roy Orbison Sings Don Gibson is a tribute album recorded by Roy Orbison for MGM Records, and his tenth studio album overall. Released in January 1967, it is a collection of songs written by Country Music Hall of Fame singer/songwriter Don Gibson who, like Orbison, often wrote about the loneliness and sorrow that love can bring. Its one single, "Too Soon to Know", became a smash hit in the UK, reaching #3 there in September 1966, and also reached #4 in Ireland and #27 in Australia. In Canada, the song reached just #71.

This album was entitled Sweet Dreams in Africa.

History
A few of the songs were recorded before his first wife Claudette's death in a motor-bike accident in June 1966. The album was put on hold as Orbison was filming The Fastest Guitar Alive. "Too Soon To Know" was banned by the BBC as they felt it was too personal about Claudette's death. The album also included a new, re-recorded version of "(I'd Be) A Legend in My Time", which previously appeared on his 1960 album Lonely and Blue.

Track listing
All songs written by Don Gibson.

Arranged by Bill McElhiney

References

Roy Orbison albums
1967 albums
Tribute albums
Albums produced by Wesley Rose
MGM Records albums